HMCS St. Laurent was a  that served in the Royal Canadian Navy and later the Canadian Forces from 1955–1974. She was the lead ship of her class, the first modern warship designed and built in Canada.

St. Laurent was laid down on 24 November 1950 by Canadian Vickers at Montreal. She was launched on 30 November the following year and was commissioned into the Royal Canadian Navy on 29 October 1955 and initially carried the pennant number DDE 205 as a destroyer escort. Prime Minister Louis St. Laurent was present at her commissioning. She was reported to have cost $15,000,000 to build. She underwent conversion to a destroyer helicopter escort (DDH) in the early 1960s and was officially re-classed with pennant DDH 205 on 4 October 1963.

Design and description

The need for the St. Laurent class came about in 1949 when Canada joined NATO and the Cold War was in its infancy. The Royal Canadian Navy (RCN) was assigned responsibility for anti-submarine warfare (ASW) and controlling sea space in the western North Atlantic. The St Laurent class were built to an operational requirement much like that which produced the British Type 12, and were powered by the same machinery plant. The rounded deck-edge forward was adopted to prevent ice forming. The vessels were designed to operate in harsh Canadian conditions. They were built to counter nuclear, biological and chemical attack conditions, which led to a design with a rounded hull, a continuous main deck, and the addition of a pre-wetting system to wash away contaminants. The living spaces on the ship were part of a "citadel" which could be sealed off from contamination for the crew safety. The ships were sometimes referred to as "Cadillacs" for their relatively luxurious crew compartments; these were also the first Canadian warships to have a bunk for every crew member since previous warship designs had used hammocks.

The destroyer escorts had a crew of 12 officers and 237 enlisted.

Armament
The St. Laurent class was fitted with twin /L50 caliber guns in two mounts for engaging both surface and air targets. The ships were also fitted with two single-mounted  guns. The class's anti-submarine armament consisted of a pair of triple-barreled Mk. NC 10 Limbo ASW mortars in a stern well. The stern well had a roller top to close it off from following seas. As with the British Type 12 design, the provision for long-range homing torpedoes (in this case BIDDER [Mk 20E] or the US Mark 35 were included. However, they were never fitted.

Machinery
The vessels of the St. Laurent class had two Babcock & Wilcox water tube boilers installed.

DDH conversion
Following successful trials aboard the frigate  and sister ship , plans to convert the St. Laurent class took shape. Th development of the beartrap, installed in  during her 1962–63 conversion, finalized the concept. By keeping the aircraft secure, the beartrap eliminated the need for deck handling from landing to the hangar, or from hangar to takeoff.

In the conversion to a helicopter-carrying vessel, St. Laurent was gutted except for machinery and some forward spaces. The hull was strengthened, fueling facilities for the helicopter and activated fin stabilizers installed. The fin stabilizers were to reduce roll in rough weather during helicopter operations. All seven St Laurents were fitted with helicopter platforms and SQS 504 Variable Depth Sonar (VDS). The single funnel was altered to twin stepped funnels to permit the forward extension of the helicopter hangar. To make room for the helicopter deck, the aft 3-inch mount and one of the Limbos were removed. The two 40 mm guns were also removed.

Operational history

After commissioning, St. Laurent was sent to the United States to work up and be evaluated and then proceeded to visit the United Kingdom. While there the ship was part of the escort for the royal yacht  on a state visit to Sweden. She was then stationed to the west coast where she performed various diplomatic duties. Prior to undergoing her conversion to a DDH, she was test fitted with the variable depth sonar (VDS).

In 1959 the Canadian government ordered that the St. Laurent class be modernized, even though the class was relatively new. This was based on the fact that the St. Laurent class was no longer capable of fighting the new nuclear submarines entering service. This was done to extend the detection range of the ships and to eliminate any speed advantage of the nuclear submarines. St. Laurent was a member of the Second Canadian Escort Squadron in 1960 based out of Esquimalt, British Columbia. In February 1960, St. Laurent, with two sister ships, departed Esquimalt, British Columbia performed a training cruise around the Pacific making several port visits and returning in April. In March 1961, St. Laurent, Ottawa and  deployed with the United States Navy's Carrier Division 17 off Hawaii.

Prior to undergoing her DDH conversion, a Variable Depth Sonar (VDS) system was test fitted to the ship, which required the alteration of the stern. The ship then underwent the DDH refit in 1962, emerging on 4 October 1963. This meant extensively rebuilding the superstructure. A hangar and flight deck were added and to make room for these the original single stack was twinned. The flight deck addition required the removal of one gun and one Limbo mount. The ship was then assigned to the east coast.

In 1969, the ship tracked a Cuban-bound Soviet task force that was transiting through Canadian waters.

St. Laurent experienced keel damage later in her career and was paid off early as the Canadian Forces opted to not include her in the Destroyer Life Extension (DELEX) program of the 1970s. She was decommissioned from the Canadian Forces on 14 June 1974 and sat in Halifax as a source for spare parts for her sisters. Her early decommissioning is attributed to cost-cutting in the Canadian Forces at the time.

The ship was sold on 27 September 1979 to Dartmouth Salvage Co. for scrapping. St. Laurent was resold and while en route to breakers in Brownsville, Texas, she took on water in the tail end of a powerful storm and foundered off Cape Hatteras on 12 January 1980.

References

Notes

Footnotes

Sources

External links

 Canadian Navy of Yesterday & Today: St. Laurent class destroyer escort

 

St. Laurent-class destroyers
Cold War destroyers of Canada
Shipwrecks of the Carolina coast
1951 ships
Maritime incidents in 1980